Castres is a railway station in Castres, Occitanie, France. It is on the Toulouse–Mazamet railway line. The station is served by TER (local) services operated by the SNCF. All trains have to stop at the station as it is a drive-in–reverse-out station.

Train services
The following services currently call at Castres:
local service (TER Occitanie) Toulouse–Castres–Mazamet

References

Railway stations in France opened in 1865
Railway stations in Tarn (department)